Politics in the Syrian Arab Republic takes place in the framework of a semi-presidential republic with nominal multiparty representation in parliament but with most opposition parties suppressed. President Bashar al-Assad, and his Arab Socialist Ba'ath Party have remained dominant forces in the country's politics since the 1970 coup d'état.

Until the early stages of the Syrian uprising, the president had broad and unchecked decree authority under a long-standing state of emergency. The end of this emergency was a key demand of the uprising. Superficial reforms in 2011 made presidential decrees subject to approval by the People's Council, the country's legislature, which is itself dominated to parties loyal to the president. The Ba'ath Party is Syria's ruling party and the previous Syrian constitution of 1973 stated that "the Arab Socialist Ba'ath Party leads society and the state." At least 167 seats of the 250-member parliament were guaranteed for the National Progressive Front, which is a coalition of the Ba'ath Party and several other much smaller allied parties. 

The Syrian Army and security services maintained a considerable presence in the neighbouring Lebanese Republic from 1975 until 24 April 2005.

Background
Hafez al-Assad took power in 1970. After his death in 2000 his son, Bashar al-Assad, succeeded him as president. A surge of interest in political reform took place after Bashar al-Assad assumed power in 2000. Human-rights activists and other civil-society advocates, as well as some parliamentarians, became more outspoken during a period referred to as the "Damascus Spring" (July 2000-February 2001). Assad also made a series of appointments of reform-minded advisors to formal and less formal positions and included a number of similarly oriented individuals in his Cabinet.

Neo-Ba'athism

The Ba'ath platform is proclaimed succinctly in the party's slogan: "Unity, freedom, and socialism." The party is both socialist, advocating state ownership of the means of industrial production and the redistribution of agricultural land (in practice, Syria's nominally socialist economy is effectively a mixed economy, composed of large state enterprises and private small businesses), and revolutionary, dedicated to carrying a pan-Arab revolution to every part of the Arab world. Founded by Michel Aflaq, a Syrian Christian, Salah al-Din al-Bitar, a Syrian Sunni, and Zaki al-Arsuzi, an alawite, the Arab Socialist Ba'ath Party, which was dissolved in 1966 following the 1966 Syrian coup d'état which led to the establishment of one Iraqi-dominated ba'ath movement and one Syrian-led ba'ath movement. The party embraces secularism and has attracted supporters of all faiths in many Arab countries, especially Iraq, Jordan, and Lebanon.

Six smaller political parties are permitted to exist and, along with the Ba'ath Party, make up the National Progressive Front (NPF), a grouping of parties that represents the sole framework of legal political party participation for citizens. While created ostensibly to give the appearance of a multi-party system, the NPF is dominated by the Ba'ath Party and does not change the essentially one-party character of the political system. Non-Ba'ath Party members of the NPF exist as political parties largely in name only and conform strictly to Ba'ath Party and government policies. There were reports in 2000 that the government was considering legislation to expand the NPF to include new parties and several parties previously banned; these changes have not taken place. However, one such party- the Syrian Social Nationalist Party- was legalised in 2005.

Traditionally, the parties of the NPF accepted the Arab nationalist and nominally socialist ideology of the government. However, the SSNP was the first party that is neither socialist nor Arab nationalist in orientation to be legalised and admitted to the NPF. This has given rise to suggestions that broader ideological perspectives would be afforded some degree of toleration in the future, but this did not occur: ethnically-based (Kurdish and Assyrian) parties continue to be repressed, most opposition parties are illegal, and a strict ban on religious parties is still enforced.

Syria's Emergency Law was in force from 1963, when the Ba'ath Party came to power, until 21 April 2011 when it was rescinded by Bashar al-Assad (decree 161). The law, justified on the grounds of the continuing war with Israel and the threats posed by terrorists, suspended most constitutional protections.

Government administration
Leadership in Damascus:

|President
|Bashar al-Assad
|Ba'ath Party
|17 July 2000
|-
|Prime Minister
|Hussein Arnous
|Ba'ath Party
|11 June 2020
|}

Leadership of the Syrian opposition in Idlib:

|President
|Salem al-Meslet
|Independent
| 12 July 2021
|-
|Prime Minister
|Abdurrahman Mustafa
|Independent
| 30 June 2019
|}
The previous Syrian constitution of 1973 vested the Ba'ath Party (formally the Arab Ba'ath Socialist Party) with leadership functions in the state and society and provided broad powers to the president. The president, approved by referendum for a 7-year term, was also Secretary General of the Ba'ath Party and leader of the National Progressive Front. During the 2011–2012 Syrian uprising, a new constitution was put to a referendum. Amongst other changes, it abolished the old article 8 which entrenched the power of the Ba'ath party. The new article 8 reads: "The political system of the state shall be based on the principle of political pluralism, and exercising power democratically through the ballot box". In a new article 88, it introduced presidential elections and limited the term of office for the president to seven years with a maximum of one re-election. The referendum resulted in the adoption of the new constitution, which came into force on 27 February 2012.
The president has the right to appoint ministers (Council of Ministers), to declare war and states of emergency, to issue laws (which, except in the case of emergency, require ratification by the People's Council), to declare amnesty, to amend the constitution, and to appoint civil servants and military personnel. The late President Hafiz al-Asad was confirmed by unopposed plebiscites five times. His son and current President Bashar al-Asad, was confirmed by an unopposed referendum in July 2000. He was confirmed again on 27 May 2007 with 97.6% of the vote

Along with the National Progressive Front, the president decides issues of war and peace and approves the state's 5-year economic plans. The National Progressive Front also acts as a forum in which economic policies are debated and the country's political orientation is determined.

The Syrian constitution of 2012 requires that the president be Muslim but does not make Islam the state religion. The judicial system in Syria is an amalgam of Ottoman, French, and Islamic laws, with three levels of courts: courts of first instance, courts of appeals, and the constitutional court, the highest tribunal. In addition, religious courts handle questions of personal and family law.

The Ba'ath Party emphasizes socialism and secular Pan-Arabism. Despite the Ba'ath Party's doctrine on building national rather than ethnic identity, the issues of ethnic, religious, and regional allegiances still remain important in Syria.

Political parties and elections
The last parliamentary election was on 19 July 2020 and the results were announced on 20 July.
2020 Syrian parliamentary election

References

Further reading

Raymond Hinnebusch: The Political Economy of Economic Liberalization in Syria, in: International Journal of Middle East Studies, Vol. 27 - Nr. 3, August 1995, S. 305–320.
Raymond Hinnebusch: State, Civil Society, and Political Change in Syria, in: A.R. Norton: Civil Society in the Middle East, Leiden, 1995.
Ismail Küpeli: Ibn Khaldun und das politische System Syriens - Eine Gegenüberstellung, München, 2007,  (critical approach with reference to the political theory of Ibn Khaldun)
Moshe Ma’oz / Avner Yaniv (Ed.): Syria under Assad, London, 1986.

External links
Syria at the United States Institute of Peace
 The Syrian Constitution accessed 13 November 2012

 

bn:সিরিয়া#রাজনীতি